Jambyl or Zhambyl Region, formerly known as Dzhambul Region until 1991,  is a region of Kazakhstan. Its capital is Taraz. The population of the region is 1,209,665; the city is 335,100. The region borders Kyrgyzstan, and is very near to Uzbekistan (all to the south). Jambyl also borders three other provinces: Karaganda Region (to the north), Turkistan Region (to the west) and Almaty Region (to the east). The province borders Lake Balkhash to its northeast. The province (and its capital during the Soviet era) was named after the Kazakh akyn (folk singer) Jambyl Jabayev.

History 
The Dzhambul Region was formed by decree of the Presidium of the Supreme Soviet on October 14, 1939 and included nine districts, of which six were separated from the South Kazakhstan and three from the Alma-Ata region.

Arys ammunition explosion 
In August 2021, nine people were killed in a major explosion in at a Kazakhstani ammunition depot at a military unit in Taraz in the Jambyl Region of Kazakhstan. As a result, Minister of Defense Nurlan Yermekbayev announced his intent to resign on 27 August 2021. Four days later his resignation was accepted by President Kassym-Jomart Tokayev, with Yermekbayev accepting responsibility for the tragedy, and was succeeded by Lieutenant General Murat Bektanov. The leaders of foreign countries and international organizations delivered condolences and all government websites were grayscaled in memoriam.

Demographics

As of 2020, the Jambyl Region has a population of 1,130,099.

Ethnic groups (2020):
Kazakh: 72.81%
Russian: 9.60%
Dungan: 5.29%
Turkish: 3.07%
Uzbek: 2.54%
Others: 6.69%

Administrative divisions
The province is administratively divided into ten districts and the city of Taraz.
 Bayzak District, with the administrative center in the auyl of Sarykemer;
 Jambyl District, the auyl of Asy;
 Korday District, the auyl of Korday;
 Merki District, the auyl of Merki;
 Moiynkum District, the auyl of Moiynkum;
 Sarysu District, the town of Janatas;
 Shu District, the auyl of Tole bi;
 Talas District, the town of Karatau;
 Turar Ryskulov District, the auyl of Kulan;
 Zhualy District, the auyl of Bauyrzhan Momyshuly.
Janatas, Karatau, Shu, and Taraz have the administrative status of a town.

Economy
Important industries include rock phosphate mining (around Karatau). The Chu River valley is one of Kazakhstan's important areas of irrigated agriculture.

The core of the rail transportation network in the region is based on the east-west Turksib rail line, which runs through Taraz and Chu toward Almaty, and the north-south Transkazakhstan line, which runs north from Chu toward Nur-Sultan. CIS Highway M 39 (which in this area forms part of European route E40) comes from Tashkent, Uzbekistan over Shymkent (capital of neighbouring province South Kazakhstan) and runs further over Taraz to Bishkek, Kyrgyzstan; then it comes to Jambyl Province again through Korday border crossing and continues east toward Almaty.

In February 2021, it was announced that a wind farm and a hydro power plant will be launched in the Zhambyl region during the 2021 year, and two more renewable energy facilities are planned to be launched in the area in the near future.

Tourism 
In 2018, the Jambyl region began the reconstruction of the Tekturmas historical complex. Located on the outskirts of the city, this complex is aimed at highlighting and preserving the cultural heritage of the country. Currently, the site is home to 14 monuments, a waterfall, observatory platforms, and a medieval style fortress that surrounds the complex.

Gallery

See also
Merke Turkic Sanctuaries

References

External links
Official website(in Russian) 

 
Regions of Kazakhstan